Caldo may refer to:

Food
 Broth, whose Spanish name is caldo
 Caldo de costilla ("rib broth"), served as breakfast in Colombia
 Caldo de pollo, Latin American chicken soup
 Caldo de queso, also known as Sonoran cheese soup, served in central Mexico and southwest United States
 Caldo de siete mares ("seven seas soup"), also known as caldo de mariscos ("seafood soup"), commonly served in Mexico
 Caldo verde, soup popularly served in Brazil and northern Portugal
 Pira caldo, Paraguayan fish stew
 Congee, rice porridge also known as arroz caldo (Spanish: caldo de arroz, "rice soup") in the Philippines
 Guarapa, also known as caldo de cana ("cane juice") in Brazil

Other
 Caldo Verde Records, American record company
 Hot Autumn (autunno caldo), series of labor actions in Italy 1969–1970
 Paolo il caldo, 1955 novel by Vitaliano Brancati
 Caldo Largo, novel by Earl Thompson